The Forest Reserve of Pinhal da Paz, abbreviated to Pinhal da Paz by the locals, is a forest reserve and recreational park of , in the center of the Picos Region of the island of São Miguel in the Portuguese archipelago of the Azores.

History
 
Historically referred to as the Mata das Criações (forest of the creatures), it was originally inherited by António do Canto Brum, a grandson of the prominent intellectual landowner José do Canto. The parcel occupied 49 hectares of volcanic rocky outcroppings and eroded pyroclasts, with species of pine, Myrica faya and Heather (Erica) scattered throughout the property. It was in this wild brush that the property-owner patiently cultivated and planted wild pines, Cryptomeria, ornamental and exotic plants (such as Hydrangeas and Azaleas), large ferns and Eucalyptus. António do Canto Brum further began to open roads into the area, constructed houses, captured rainwater, and created orchards and pastureland.

The new park soon attracted many of the local residences and gained fame in tourist circles, becoming an obligatory stop on pedestrian trails. António do Canto Brum eventually changed the name to Pinhal da Paz.

By the 1970s, the descendants of Canto had tried to maintain the character of the park, but the costs of such an endeavour were overwhelming, it slowly returned to wild brush.

On 1 July 1982, the regional authority instigated the Reserva de Recreio do Pinhal da Paz, in order to create and implement measures to conserve the park and preserve the character of its  greenspaces. The Reserve was to be run by a commission, which was never nominated, and the administration of the park lapsed, resulting in a continued degradation of its spaces.

After several starts-and-stops, on 19 September 1988 the Regional Government acquired Pinhal da Paz from the family of António do Canto.  Measures to improve the park only began in the VII Regional Government, when it was placed under the umbrella of the Secretaria Regional de Agricultura, Pescas e Ambiente, and administration of the Direcção Regional dos Rescursos Florestais, where it was renamed Reserva Florestal de Recreio Pinhal da Paz (under decree 15/2000/A, 21 June 2000). It was only in 1998 that public works were initiated to recuperate the property, now considerably degenerated, under the new authority of the Direcção Regional. This project, in addition to clearing and transforming the public nature of the park, also introduced new species of endemic species and infrastructures to support visits to the park.

Geography
The park is located in the central Picos Region of the island of São Miguel, along the border between the parishes of Fajã de Cima and Pico da Pedra.
 
Th reserve occupies 49 hectares aligned along its northern border with the lands of the descendants of Hermano Moniz Feijó (João Manuel Clemente Almeida and Armando Soares Cordeiro), south by the lands held by the descendants of Maria Beatriz Noronha da Costa and Rodolfo Pires de Gouveia, east by the Canada do Valagão and the property owned by the descendants of Maria Cecília Câmara Marques Moreira Dhar and to the west by the Caminho das Criações.

Infrastructures
From the entrance, accessible from the main gate, the park extends to the northeast and encompasses several differentiated spaces.  Parking is located on the dirt plain adjacent to the main gate, while both access roads and pedestrian trails extend further into the bush: the space was designed to accommodate both passenger vehicles and buses.

The forest ranger's residence and dependencies are located along the restricted roadway to the main spaces, and houses the forest ranger and his family throughout the year.  The rest of the park follows the identifiable pedestrian paths (signposted by various trail markers) to different sections, which include: picnic/barbecue areas, individual public washrooms (for both sexes), animal paddocks (for ducks and deer), a children's playground, a hedge-maze and an open field for other diversions, in addition to a maintenance yard for forest services. In addition, there is a small, simple hermitage near the ranger's residence dedicated to Senhora da Paz (Lady of Peace).

To complement the grounds, the Forest Service also constructed small miniature buildings (replicas of many of the real-life buildings) specifically for small children.

Many pedestrian trails wind throughout the park, which extend uphill to the two peaks in the park, covering  of trails that also includes six individual exercise stations.

References
Notes

Sources
 
 

São Miguel Island
Parks in the Azores
Forest reserves